Daniel Mariano Bueno (born December 15, 1983) is a Brazilian footballer who plays for Glória as a forward.

Career

Club career
Daniel Bueno previously played for São Caetano in the Copa do Brasil. He also had spells with Omiya Ardija, SK Sigma Olomouc and Tarxien Rainbows, where at the latter he finished second top-scorer of the 2008–09 Maltese Premier League. After one season playing for Odra Wodzisław in the league of Poland, he returned with Tarxien Rainbows, where he is going to play with other 4 Brazilian players—who are: Everton Antonio Pereira, and the three new signings—Sergio Pacheco de Oliveira, Ricardo Mion Varella Costa & Cristiano Rodrigues. His contract lasts two years and until Tarxien Rainbows remain in the Premiere Division he would like to remain playing for this team.

References

External links
 
 
 
 Daniel Bueno at ZeroZero

1983 births
Living people
Brazilian footballers
Brazilian expatriate footballers
Clube Atlético Sorocaba players
Associação Desportiva São Caetano players
Esporte Clube Santo André players
Esporte Clube Noroeste players
Omiya Ardija players
SK Sigma Olomouc players
Tarxien Rainbows F.C. players
Odra Wodzisław Śląski players
Esporte Clube XV de Novembro (Piracicaba) players
Associação Atlética Flamengo players
Rio Claro Futebol Clube players
Bangu Atlético Clube players
Clube Náutico Capibaribe players
Associação Atlética Portuguesa (Santos) players
Barra Futebol Clube players
Comercial Futebol Clube (Ribeirão Preto) players
Grêmio Esportivo Glória players
Ekstraklasa players
Maltese Premier League players
Campeonato Brasileiro Série D players
Czech First League players
J2 League players
Association football forwards
Brazilian expatriate sportspeople in the Czech Republic
Brazilian expatriate sportspeople in Poland
Brazilian expatriate sportspeople in Malta
Brazilian expatriate sportspeople in Iraq
Expatriate footballers in the Czech Republic
Expatriate footballers in Poland
Expatriate footballers in Malta
Expatriate footballers in Iraq
Footballers from São Paulo